Motéma Music is a jazz and world music record label in the United States. It was founded in 2003 in San Francisco Bay Area. This record label’s catalog spans genres, cultures, and generations and has received Grammy recognition for over twenty-five albums in jazz, Latin-jazz, reggae, and R&B. Founded by label president and recording artist Jana Herzen, Motéma was the first to bring soul/jazz musician Gregory Porter to international attention with his Grammy-nominated first albums, Water and Be Good and his hit song "1960 What?" The label launched international careers for jazz piano star Joey Alexander, modern soul singer Deva Mahal, and Cuban musician Pedrito Martinez, among others. 

Also in the label’s catalog are recordings by established performers such as Randy Weston, Geri Allen, David Murray, Monty Alexander, and Charnett Moffett, alongside releases by younger players including Donny McCaslin, Mark Guiliana, Jihye Lee, and NEA Jazzmaster Terri Lyne Carrington + Social Science, whose much-talked-about Grammy-nominated activist album Waiting Game garnered 2020 Album of the Year, Artist of the Year and Artist of the Year accolades from Downbeat among other awards and recognition.

History
Motéma Music was founded in the San Francisco Bay Area. A production company since 1997, it became a label after signing Babatunde Lea for his album, Soul Pools. Jana Herzen, a singer-songwriter who composed and performed on "'Round the World" on Soul Pools, was trying to get out some records and created the label to do so, never intending to be a CEO.  Herzen chose the name because of its similarity to the sound of "Motown".

Herzen moved the label to New York in 2005.  At one time, the label was based in the third floor of the Langston Hughes House. The label has since changed locations but remains in Harlem. The Motéma logo was designed by Winston Smith.

The label is very artist-centric and focuses on each artist's individual development. It is because of this reputation that such artists as Geri Allen and Rufus Reid came to the label.

Jazz Therapy

Roni Ben-Hur and Jana Herzen founded the Jazz Therapy series as a benefit for the Dizzy Gillespie Memorial Fund of the Englewood Hospital and Medical Center Foundation in Englewood, New Jersey, which underwrites medical care for uninsured jazz musicians who are unable to pay for medical care. The series so far has included CDs by Ben-Hur and Ithamara Koorax, and Juarez Moreira. Ben-Hur met Nilson Matta in the performance lounge of Englewood Hospital, which led to their collaboration on the third release in the series.

Awards and honors

Grammy Awards
 2011: 53rd Grammy Nominated for Best Jazz Vocal Album – Water - Gregory Porter
 2012: 54th Grammy Nominated for Best Regae Album  – Harlem Kingston Express Live! – Monty Alexander
 2012: 54th Grammy Nominated for Best Jazz Vocal – The Music of Randy Newman – Roseanna Vitro
 2013: 55th Grammy Nominated for Best Traditional R&B Performance – Real Good Hands, from Be Good – Gregory Porter
 2015: 57th Grammy Win for Best Latin Jazz Album – The Offense of the Drum – Arturo O'Farrill
 2015: 57th Grammy Nominated for Best Jazz Vocal Album – I Wanna Be Evil – René Marie 
 2015: 57th Grammy Nominated for Best Instrumental Composition and Best Large Jazz Ensemble Album – Quiet Pride – The Elizabeth Catlett Project – Rufus Reid
 2015: 57th Grammy Nominated for Best Latin Album – The Pedrito Martinez Group – Pedrito Martinez
 2016: 58th Grammy Win for Best Instrumental Composition and Latin Grammy Best Latin Jazz/Jazz Album – Cuba: The Conversation Continues - Arturo O'Farrill
 2016: 58th Grammy Nominated for Best Large Ensemble Jazz Album – Cuba: The Conversation Continues – Arturo O'Farrill
 2016: 58th Grammy Nominated for Best Jazz Improvisation and Best Instrumental Jazz Album – My Favorite Things – Joey Alexander
 2016: 58th Grammy Nominated for Best Jazz Vocal Album – Many A New Day – Karrin Allyson
 2017: 59th Grammy Nominated for Best Improvised Jazz Solo – Countdown – Joey Alexander 
 2017: 59th Grammy Nominated for Best Jazz Vocal Album – Sound of Red – René Marie 
 2017: 59th Grammy Won Best Large Ensemble Jazz Album and Best Instrumental Composition – Presidential Suite: Eight Variations on Freedom – Ted Nash
 2018: 60th Grammy Win for Best Instrumental Composition – Familia: Tribute to Bebo and Chico – Arturo O'Farrill and Chucho Valdes
 2019: 61st Grammy Nomination Best Contemporary Instrumental Album – Beat Music! Beat Music! Beat Music! – Mark Guiliana
 2019: 61st Grammy Nomination Best Instrumental Improvisation – La Madrina – Melissa Aldana

Discography

2003
Babatunde Lea – Soul Pools with Ku-umba Frank Lacy, Hilton Ruiz, John Benîtez, Mario Rivera, Kevin Jones, Jana Herzen, Raul Midon, Ernie Watts, Geoff Brennan 7-09363-7136-2
Babatunde Lea – Level of Intent with Jon Faddis, Charnette Moffett [sic], Hilton Ruiz, Frank Colón, John Purcell, Frank Lacy, Tommy James, Santi Debriano, Kenny Barron, Marvin Horn 8-20320-0047-2 (reissue of a 1996 Diaspora Records album)
Lynne Arriale Trio (Jay Anderson, Steve Davis) – Arise MTM71372

2004
Babatunde Lea – Suite Unseen:  Summoner of the Ghost with Steve Rurre, Richard Howell, Glen Pearson, Geoff Brennan, Ron Belcher, Bujo Kevin Jones  MTM 00002
Jana Herzen – Soup's on Fire MOTEMA 6681-2
Discomind – The Fresh Turnout unnumbered [digital download; physical CDs are promotional items only]
DJ Jackie Christie – Made 4 U RAD 90079-2

2005
Lynn Arriale Trio (Jay Anderson, Steve Davis) – Come Together MTM 00001

2006
Marc Cary – Focus with David Ewell, Sameer Gupta MTM-00005
Bujo Kevin Jones with Kelvin Sholar, George Makinto, Brian Horton, Kevin Louis, Damon Warmack, Jamieo Brown  – Tenth World MTM 0000-3
Kit McClure Band – Just the Thing:  The Sweethearts Project Revisited RH 9005
Lynne Arrialle Trio (Jay Anderson, Steve Davis) – Live MTM-00007

2007
Marc Cary & Shon "Chance" Miller  – XR Project:  AbStraKt|BlaK   MTM-00004
Pete Levin – Deacon Blues featuring Joe Beck, Mike DeMicco, Danny Gottlieb, Tony Levin, Ken Lovelett, Carlos Valdez MTM-0008
Roni Ben-Hur – Keepin' It Open with Jeremy Pelt, Ronnie Mathews, Santi Debriano, Lewis Nash, Steve Kroon 232537
Rufus Reid Quintet (Sumi Tonooka, Tim Horner, Freddie Hendrix, Rich Perry) – Live at the Kennedy Center MTM-00009 (CD+DVD)
Ryan Cohan – One Sky with Bob Sheppard, Geof Bradfield, Tito Carillo, James Cammack, Lorin Cohen, Kobie Watkins, Ruben Alvarez, Jean-Christophe Leroy MTM-00012
Amy London – When I Look in Your Eyes featuring John Hicks, Lee Musiker, Roni Ben-Hur, Rufus Reid, Leroy Williams, Chris Byars MTM-00011
KJ Denhert – Lucky 7 MTM-00014

2008
Antonio Ciacca Quintet (Kengo Nakamura, Rodney Green, Stacy Dillard, Joe Magnarelli) – Rush Life 232536 
Bujo Kevin Jones – Bujo Kevin Jones & Tenth World Live! with Kelvin Sholar, Brian Horton, Kevin Louis, Joshua David, Jaimeo Brown  MTM-00020
KJ Denhert – Dal Vivo a Umbria Jazz with Bennett Paster, Ray Lavier, Mamadou Ba, John Caban, and featuring Aaron Heick MTM - 00017
The New Jazz Composers Octet – The Turning Gate MTM-00019
Roni Ben-Hur, Gene Bertoncini – Smile:  Jazz Therapy, Volume 1 MTM - 00018

2009
Lynne Arriale – Nuance:  The Bennett Studio Sessions featuring Randy Brecker, George Mraz, Anthony Pinciotti MTM-00022
Charnett Moffett – The Art of Improvisation with Will Calhoun, Yunchen Lhamo, Pat Jones MTM-21
Sertab Erener, Demir Demirkan – Painted on Water MTM23
Oran Etkin – Kelenia MTM - 24
Tessa Souter – Obsession MTM-27
Babatunde Lea's Umbo Weti:  A Tribute to Leon Thomas with Dwight Trible, Ernie Watts, Patrice Rushen, Gary Brown MTM-25
Alexis Cole – The Greatest Gift MTM-26
N.E.D. – No Evidence of Disease MTM-29
Ithamara Koorax, Juarez Moreira – Bim Bom - The Complete João Gilberto Songbook (Jazz Therapy, Vol. 2) MTM-30
Roni Ben-Hur – Fortuna  with Ronnie Mathews, Rufus Reid, Lewis Nash, Steve Kroon MTM-28
2009 Motéma Summer Sampler
Antonio Ciacca Quintet (Kengo Nakamura, Ulysses Owens, Stacy Dillard, Steve Grossman) – Lagos Blues MTM-32
2009 Motéma Winter Sampler

2010
Rufus Reid featuring Steve Allee & Duduka da Fonseca – Out Front MTM-36
Tomoko Sugawara – Along the Silk Road with Robert Dick and Ozan Aksöy MTM-31
Geri Allen – Flying Toward the Sound  MTM-37
 Lynne Arriale – Solo MTM-38 [unreleased]
Sertab Erener, Demir Demirkan – Love (EP) MTM-44 [digital download; only promo CDs exist]
Marc Cary – Focus Trio Live 2009 MTM-33
Patrick Stanfield Jones – A Heart and an Open Road with Barry Wiesenfeld, Don Gardner, Steven "Muddy" Roues, Rave Tesar, Jana Herzen, Kit McClure, Erik Lawrence, Chip Larison MTM-39
Gregory Porter – Water MTM-41
Charnett Moffett – Treasure MTM-43
Geri Allen and Timeline – Live MTM-42
Ryan Cohan – Another Look MTM-45
Motéma Music Summer Sampler 2010
Oran Etkin – Wake Up Clarinet! MTM-TMB-46-1
Sameer Gupta – Namaskar  with Marc Cary, Pt. Ramesh Misra, Srinivas Reddy, David Boyce, Prasant Radhakrishnan, Charith Premawardanan, David Ewell MTM-49
Randy Weston – The Storyteller MTM-51
KJ Denhert – Album No. 9 MTM-47
Bettina Jonic – The Bitter Mirror:  Songs by Bob Dylan and Bertolt Brecht MTM-50 (reissue of 1975 album)

2011
Lynne Arriale – Convergence MTM-54
Rondi Charleston – Who Knows Where the Time Goes with Dave Stryker, James Genus, Clarence Penn, Lynne Arriale, Brandon McCune, Mayra Casales MTM-55
Amy London – Let's Fly featuring Roni Ben-Hur, Santi Debriano, Steve Williams, Steve Kroon, Tadro Hammer, Glauco Sagebin, Richard Wyands  MTM-56
T.K. Blue – Latin Bird featuring Willie Martinez, Roland Guerrero, Essiet O. Essiet, Theo Hill and special guests Lewis Nash, Steve Turre MTM-57
2011 Motéma Music Sampler
Rufus Reid & Out Front (Steve Allee & Duduka da Fonseca)  featuring Toninho Horta, Bobby Watson, Freddie Hendrix, JD Allen – Hues of a Different Blue MTM-58
René Marie – Voice of My Beautiful Country MTM-59
Malika Zarra – Berber Taxi MTM-60
Nilson Matta and Roni Ben-Hur with Victor Lewis and Café – Mojave - Jazz Therapy, Vol. 3 MTM-64
Jean-Michel Pilc – Essential MTM-61
Roseanna Vitro – The Music of Randy Newman, arranged by Mark Soskin with Sara Caswell, Dean Johnson, Tim Horner, Jamey Haddad, Steve Cardenas MTM-65
Monty Alexander – Harlem - Kingston Express Live! with Karl Wright, Yotam Silberstein, Hassan Shakur, Obed Calvaire. Robert Thomas, Hoova Simpson, Andy Bassford MTM-67
JC Stylles featuring Pat Bianchi and Lawrence Leathers – Exhilaration and Other States MTM-68
Geri Allen – A Child Is Born MTM-69
A Moving Sound – A Moving Sound [compilation from their second and third albums] MTM-71
Pilc Moutin Hoenig – Threedom MTM-72
David Murray Cuban Ensemble – Plays Nat King Cole en Español with special guests Daniel Melingo, Juanjo Mosalini, The Sinfonieta of Sines  MTM-73
René Marie – Black Lace Freudian Slip with Kevin Bales, Rodney Jordan, Kenneth Baxter, Quentin Baxter, Bill Kopper, Lionel Young, Dexter Payne, Michael A. Croan MTM-74
Pilc Moutin Hoenig – Threedom
Gregory Porter – 1960 What? The Remixes
Dennis Rollins Velocity Trio – The 11th Gate

2012
Elio Villafranca, Arturo Stable – Dos y Mas
Gregory Porter – Be Good
Lynne Arriale – Solo
Joe Locke / Geoffrey Keezer Group – Signing
Ablaye Cissoko / Volker Goetze – Amanke Dionti
Tessa Souter – Beyond The Blue
 Brazilian Trio – Constelação
 The Cookers – Believe
 Lakecia Benjamin – Retox
 Roni Ben-Hur, Santi Debriano – Our Thing
 Alexis Cole, Jeremy Kahn, Frank Basile, Kevin Bales, et al. – Joy Road: The Complete Works of Pepper Adams, Volumes 1-5

2013
David Murray Infinity Quartet featuring Macy Gray & Gregory Porter – Be My Monster Love MTM 112
Marc Cary – For the Love of Abbey MTM 122
Geri Allen – Grand River Crossings MTM 128
'The Joe Locke Quartet with Lincoln's Symphony Orchestra – Wish Upon A Star

2014
Arturo O'Farrill & the Afro Latin Jazz Orchestra – The Offense of the Drum
Ginger Baker – Why?
Kellylee Evans – I Remember When
Omer Avital – New Song
Oran Etkin – Gathering Light
The Cookers – Time and Time Again
Brian Jackson & Kentyah Frazer – Evolutionary Minded, furthering the Legacy of Gil Scott-Heron

2015
Joe Locke – Love Is A Pendulum
Arturo O'Farrill & the Afro Latin Jazz Orchestra – Cuba: The Conversation Continues
Shai Maestro Trio – Untold Stories

2016 
 Jaimeo Brown Transcendence – Work Songs 
 René Marie – Sound of Red 
 Motema Compilations – The Same Heart (Original Motion Picture Soundtrack)
 David Murray, Gerri Allen, and Terri Lyne Carrington Power Trio – Perfection 
 The Pedrito Martinez Group – Habana Dreams 
 Ben Wendel – What We Bring 
 Will Calhoun – Celebrating Elvin Jones 
 Joey Alexander – Countdown
 Ted Nash – Presidential Suite: Eight Variations on Freedom
 Donny McCaslin – Beyond Now

2017 
 Kneebody – Anti-Hero
 Petros Klampanis – Chroma
 Gerald Clayton – Tributary Tales 
 Charnett Moffett – Music From Our Soul 
 Jack DeJohnette, John Scofield, John Medeski, Larry Grenadier – Hudson 
 Chucho Valdés and Arturo O'Farrill – Familiar: Tribute to Bebo and Chico 
 Mark Guiliana – Jersey
 Joey Alexander – Joey.Monk.Live!
 Deva Mahal – EP

2018 
 David Murray – Blues for Memo
 Deva Mahal – Run Deep
 Playing for Change – Listen to the Music
 Kneebody – How High feat. Inara George 
 Joey Alexander – Eclipse
 Gilad Hekselman – Ask for Chaos
 Stefon Harris – Sonic Creed 
 Donny McCaslin – Blow
 Ben Wendel – The Seasons 
 Lori Henriques – Legion of Peace
 Joey Alexander – A Joey Alexander Christmas 
 Nett Duo, Jana Herzen, Charnett Moffett – Overtones

2019 
 Mark Guiliana – BEAT MUSIC! BEAT MUSIC! BEAT MUSIC!
 Melissa Aldana – Visions 
 Gilad Hekselman – Further Chaos 
 Charnett Moffett – Bright New Day 
 Deva Mahal – Goddamn/Your Only One 
 Donny McCaslin – Head of Mine/Tokyo
 Terri Lyne Carrington – Waiting Game

2020 
Jana Herzen – Nothing But Love
Jana Herzen and Charnett Moffett – 'Round the World 
Jana Herzen – Kapolioka'ehukai
The Royal Bopsters – Party of Four

References

External links
 Official site
 Motéma Music's channel on YouTube

American record labels
Jazz record labels
World music record labels
Record labels established in 2003